Mississippi Valley State University (MVSU, The Valley or Valley) is a public historically black university in Mississippi Valley State, Mississippi, adjacent to Itta Bena, Mississippi. MVSU is a member-school of the Thurgood Marshall College Fund.

History
The institution, which opened in 1950, was created by the Mississippi Legislature as Mississippi Vocational College. The legislation to form the institution was signed into law by Governor Thomas L. Bailey on April 5, 1946. On February 10, 1950, Governor Fielding L. Wright served as the main speaker at the opening ceremony.

The legislature anticipated that legal segregation of public education was in danger because there were increasing challenges to it through legal suits (in 1954 it was declared unconstitutional in the United States Supreme Court's decision in Brown v. Board of Education). It created this institution in the hopes that it would attract African-American applicants who might otherwise apply to Mississippi's premier whites-only institutions: the University of Mississippi, Mississippi State University, and the University of Southern Mississippi.

State leaders hoped that founding separate institutions of higher learning for Mississippi's black population would reduce the pressure to integrate the state's premier universities. To attract the support of those who opposed any government action to provide higher education to black people, those proposing creation of M.V.C. used the term "vocational" to imply that the institution's main purpose would be to train black people to take on blue-collar jobs.

The site selection committee appointed by the Board of Trustees of State Institutions of Higher Learning had originally selected as a site the former Greenwood Army Air Base, which had many facilities ready for use and thus would have been a very cost-effective choice. The Greenwood Commonwealth celebrated the choice. However, residents of Carroll County, Mississippi objected to having the institution located near their properties.

After further study, the committee selected a site in Itta Bena. Whites of that town also objected to having a black institution nearby, so the final site chosen was away from the downtown area, and on land that was not good for cultivation.

In 1964, Mississippi Vocational College was renamed Mississippi Valley State College. In February 1969, a nonviolent student boycott, which included eight hundred students, male and female, was organized to protest President James Herbert White's administration. The students demanded required courses in black history, more library purchases of works by black writers, remedial courses in English and Math, scheduling of prominent black speakers, and fewer curfew restrictions.

In the early 1970s, civil rights leaders continued to protest the inequalities in higher education opportunities offered to whites and blacks in Mississippi. In an effort to defuse some of the criticism, Gov. Bill Waller proposed changing the names of three black institutions from "colleges" to "universities". Thus, in 1974, the institution was renamed again, as Mississippi Valley State University.

Following President White, Dr. Ernest A. Boykins, Jr.  took office in July 1971. Dr. Joe L. Boyer became MVSU's third president in January 1982 and was followed by Dr. William W. Sutton in July 1988. Dr. Lester C. Newman became the fifth president of MVSU on July 1, 1998. Dr. Donna H. Oliver became MVSU's sixth president and first female president on January 1, 2009. On November 6, 2013, Dr. William Bynum took office as MVSU's seventh president.

In May 2017, Bynum departed MVSU to become president of Jackson State University. Dr. Jerryl Briggs, who served as executive vice president and chief operating officer in Bynum's administration, was named interim president of the university shortly afterwards. On October 19, 2017, Briggs was officially named as the university's eighth president.

In a 1997 article in Innovative Higher Education, the journalist Dale Thorn describes MVSU's successful attempt to avoid a merger with another institution and to remain a separate entity.

In 1998, the university renamed many of the buildings on campus, except for those named for white supremacist politicians Walter Sillers, Jr., Fielding Wright, and J. H. White.

Campus

The campus is on a  tract of land adjacent to U.S. Highway 82.

It is in Mississippi Valley State census-designated place, in unincorporated Leflore County, in the Mississippi Delta region.

MVSU includes faculty and staff apartments and other residential apartments. Dependent children living in these units are within the Greenwood-Leflore School District. These apartments were formerly served by the Leflore County School District. Effective July 1, 2019 this district consolidated into the Greenwood-Leflore School District.

Academics
Mississippi Valley State University offers undergraduate and graduate degrees through the following entities:
College of Art & Sciences
College of Professional Studies
College of Education
Graduate School

MVSU offers an honors program to better cater to high-achieving undergraduate students on campus.

MVSU was accredited in 1968 by the Southern Association of Colleges and Schools Commission on Colleges to award bachelor's and master's degrees.

Student activities
Activities include theater, orchestra, and band. Students may work on the Delvian (yearbook) or the Delta Devil Gazette (student-run newspaper). Leadership opportunities are found in the Student Government Association (SGA) or other organizations such as English Club, Future Teachers of America, and Trades and Industries Club.

NPHC Greek-letter organizations
Alpha Kappa Alpha sorority, Epsilon Pi chapter
Alpha Phi Alpha fraternity, Zeta Phi chapter
Delta Sigma Theta sorority, Eta Alpha chapter
Iota Phi Theta fraternity, Eta Kappa chapter
Kappa Alpha Psi fraternity, Zeta Zeta chapter
Omega Psi Phi fraternity, Beta Theta chapter
Phi Beta Sigma fraternity, Delta Phi chapter
Sigma Gamma Rho sorority, Kappa Chi chapter
Zeta Phi Beta sorority, Psi Gamma chapter

Non-NPHC Greek-letter organizations

Alpha Phi Omega service fraternity, Alpha Epsilon Phi chapter
Gamma Sigma Sigma service sorority, Zeta Psi chapter
Alpha Phi Sigma national criminal justice honor society, Zeta Tau chapter.
Kappa Kappa Psi national honorary band fraternity, Delta Pi chapter
Tau Beta Sigma national honorary band sorority, Gamma Eta chapter

Mean Green Marching Machine
Mississippi Valley State University's marching band is known as the "Mean Green Marching Machine" (also goes by the moniker of "The Mack Of The SWAC") and the "Satin Dolls" are the featured dance squad. The band holds the distinction of being the first African-American band to participate in the Tournament of Roses parade, which it achieved in 1965.

Athletics

MVSU's colors are forest green and white. Their nickname is the Delta Devils for men's teams and Devilettes for women's teams. MVSU sports teams participate in NCAA Division I (I-AA for football) in the Southwestern Athletic Conference (SWAC). Famous alumni include NFL wide receiver Jerry Rice of the 1984 football team.

The Mississippi Valley State University Department of Athletics currently sponsors intercollegiate:

Women's
Basketball
Cross country
Golf
Track
Soccer
Volleyball
Softball
Bowling
Men's
Basketball
Cross country
Golf
Track 
Baseball
Football
Tennis

In 1986, the men's basketball team received a 16 seed in the NCAA Men's Division I Basketball Championship. There, they faced #1 ranked Duke on national television in the first round. The Delta Devils almost became the first 16 seed to beat a 1 seed in NCAA Tournament history. They forced 23 turnovers and led 40–37 at the half before falling 85–78.

In 2016, MVSU completed $17.5 million worth of renovations to the Harrison HPER Complex.  The 87,042 square foot multi-purpose arena is home to MVSU men's basketball, women's basketball, volleyball, and commencement ceremonies.  The facility includes features such as fitness centers, an indoor walking track, and three technology HPER classrooms.

WVSD 91.7 FM
MVSU's on-campus public radio station is WVSD 91.7 FM.  The station offers a variety of programming involving MVSU, current events, and music.

Notable alumni

References

External links

 
Public universities and colleges in Mississippi
Historically black universities and colleges in the United States
Universities and colleges accredited by the Southern Association of Colleges and Schools
Education in Leflore County, Mississippi
Buildings and structures in Leflore County, Mississippi
Educational institutions established in 1950
1950 establishments in Mississippi